Gymnopilus depressus is a species of mushroom in the family Hymenogastraceae.

Description

Habitat and distribution
Gymnopilus depressus fruits on logs, and has been found in Jamaica in November.

See also

List of Gymnopilus species

References

External links
Gymnopilus depressus at Index Fungorum

depressus
Fungi of North America
Taxa named by William Alphonso Murrill